The term humus form is not the same as the term humus. Forest humus form describes the various arrangement of organic and mineral horizons at the top of soil profiles. It can be composed entirely of organic horizons, meaning an absence of the mineral horizon. Experts worldwide have developed different types of classifications over time, and humus forms are mainly categorized into mull, mor, and moder orders in the ecosystems of British Columbia.  Mull humus form is distinguishable from the other two forms in formation, nutrient cycling, productivity, etc.

Formation

The formation of mull humus form results from various factors, including regional climate, parent rock, vegetation, and soil organism. Mull order presents in deciduous forests, and the development is often associated with a mild climate in terms of warm temperature and moderate precipitation, also rich soil parent materials. Soil organisms, including invertebrates and microbes, are the agents for the intimate mixing of soil organic matter into the mineral soil rather than organic matter accumulation on the surface, leading to the humus form of mull order.

Earthworms are the dominant fauna group in the mull order. They break down the decomposed material into small pieces and mix those residues into the soil through their activity, having significant roles in decomposition. Thus, conducting abundant clay-mineral complexes in the macro-structured A horizon. The functions of the earthworms have a decisive influence on the control of soil organic matter levels. Other agents may also contribute to incorporating soil organic matter into the mineral soil, such as white rot fungi and bacterias belonging to the microbial group. They act as essential decomposers, facilitating the breakdown process of organic residues. Potential horizons included in the mull order are L, F, H, and Ah horizons, with no consideration of B or C horizons in humus form.

Characteristics

Mull humus has a more rapid and complete decomposition. Due to the presence of soil organisms and high biological activity, the disappearance of plant litter is fast, and there are no distinct layers because thick organic horizons do not accumulate. Conversely, the Ah horizon is well developed, resulting from the assemblage of organic matter with mineral particles. Broadleaf tree species, the significant components in the deciduous ecosystem aligned with mull humus, appear to be effective in building soil organic matter levels. Also, plants under the mull humus produce litters that are easier decomposable with a low C:N ratio,  allowing nutrient release, preventing immobilization, and encouraging high bioturbation. Moreover, a relatively complete decomposition relates to more completely oxidized organic acids, promoting a higher value of pH and base saturation in the soil.

Biodiversity and fertility

Mull humus form is the cause and result of plant-soil relationships. Litter quality, soil nutrient availability, and organism activity are related. Mull humus has high biomass and species richness of soil fauna, ranging from megafauna to microfauna. Those soil organisms have high nutrient requirements because they have high energy costs for capturing spaces and nutrients under high competition, explaining the fast use of nutrients. Also, the variety of organisms reflects nutrient availability, which is necessary for the build-up of mull humus. Consequently, the high nutrient availability and fast use of nutrients allow rapid cycling of nutrients.

A rapid nutrient cycling can further contribute to soil fertility and enrich aboveground and belowground biodiversity, indicating a high level of biodiversity and productivity. Optimal plant growth depends on the degree of litter decomposition because litter provides most nutrients required by plants. Associating with soil organisms, a positive feedback loop will be formed: the higher the litter quality, the faster organic matter decomposition, the faster nutrient cycling, and the faster vegetation growth. More plants cohabit in mull humus, and the plant biodiversity is highly related to nutrient availability and the impacts of the soil acidity. Too much nutrient availability may negatively impact plant growth, but the high competition between soil organisms can deal with the concern. The effects of mull humus on the vegetation growth are apparent.

References

Soil science